Eckhardt is a surname and less commonly a given name. Notable people with the name include:

Surname 
Danielle Eckhardt (born 1982), American painter
Edris Eckhardt (1905–1998), American ceramic and glass artist
Franz Eckhardt (born 1927), Austrian bobsledder
Fred Eckhardt (1926–2015), American brewer and writer
Fritz Eckhardt (1907-1995), Austrian actor, director, and writer
Gisela Eckhardt (born 1926), German physicist and co-developer of the Raman laser
Jeffrey Edward Eckhardt (born 1965), English footballer
Gregory Eckhardt (born 1989), American soccer player
Jacob Eckhardt (1835–1881), American Republican member of the Wisconsin State Assembly
Johann Georg von Eckhart (1664–1730), German historian and linguist
Johann-Heinrich Eckhardt (1896–1945), German general in the Wehrmacht during World War II
Johnny Eckhardt (1911–1991), American freak show performer
Julius Eckhardt Raht (1826–1879), German engineer and businessman, pioneer of the mining and smelting of copper in Eastern Tennessee
Kai Eckhardt (born 1961), German composer and bassist
Kate Eckhardt (born 1997), Australian slalom canoeist
Linda West Eckhardt (born 1939), American culinary writer
Maik Eckhardt (born 1970), German sport shooter
Neele Eckhardt (born 1992), German triple jumper
Ox Eckhardt (1901–1951), American baseball player
Paul-Luis Eckhardt (born 2000), German football midfielder
Peter Ralph Eckhardt (born 1960), Australian slalom canoeist
Robert C. Eckhardt (1913–2001), Texas congressman
Sean Eckhardt (born 1970), American former figure skater, retired boxer, and reality television personality
Sophie-Carmen Eckhardt-Gramatté (1899–1974), Russian-born Canadian composer and virtuoso pianist and violinist
Todd Eckhart, former member of the American eight-piece ska/soul band The Pietasters
Walter Eckhardt (1906–1994), German politician of the All-German Bloc/League of Expellees and Deprived of Rights (GB/BHE) and later CSU
William Eckhardt (lawyer), American lawyer and formerly military officer
William Eckhardt (trader) (born 1955), American commodities and futures trader and fund manager

Given name 
Meister Eckhart (1260–1328), German theologian, philosopher, and mystic
Eckhardt Schultz (born 1964), West German rower
Eckhardt Tielscher (born 1942), German volleyball player

Fictional characters 
Lt. Max Eckhardt, in the 1989 American superhero film Batman, directed by Tim Burton
Thomas Eckhardt, in the television series Twin Peaks

See also
Eckhard

Surnames from given names